Feuquières Lake is a freshwater body of the southeastern portion of Eeyou Istchee James Bay (municipality), in Jamésie, in the administrative region of Nord-du-Québec, in the province of Quebec, in Canada.

This body of water extends in the townships of Feuquières and Robert. Forestry is the main economic activity of the sector. Recreational tourism activities come second.

The hydrographic slope of Lake Feuquières is accessible through the forest road R1032 (North-South direction) which passes on the west side of Gabriel Lake (Opawica River tributary); in addition, route 167 passes on the east side through the Normandin River, connecting Chibougamau to Saint-Félicien, Quebec. The surface of Lake Feuquières is usually frozen from early November to mid-May, however, safe ice circulation is generally from mid-November to mid-April.

Geography

Toponymy
This hydronym evokes the work of life of Isaac de Pas, marquess of Feuquières (1618-1688), colonel of infantry and lieutenant general. He served as viceroy of New France, from August 30, 1660 to October 5, 1661. This hydronym was made official on November 2, 1956 by the Quebec Geography Commission, the current Commission de toponymie du Quebec.

The toponym "Lac Feuquières" was officialized on December 5, 1968 by the Commission de toponymie du Québec, when it was created.

Notes and references

See also 

Eeyou Istchee James Bay
Lakes of Nord-du-Québec
Nottaway River drainage basin